The Paradise P1 LSA is a Brazilian light-sport aircraft, designed and produced by Paradise Aircraft of Feira de Santana and introduced in 2008. The aircraft is supplied as a complete ready-to-fly aircraft.

Design and development
The P1 was designed to comply with the US light-sport aircraft rules and was accepted as a factory-built special light-sport aircraft in 2009. It features a strut-braced high wing, a two-seats-in-side-by-side configuration enclosed cockpit, fixed tricycle landing gear and a single engine in tractor configuration.

The aircraft is made from welded steel tubing covered in aluminum sheet. The standard engine is the  Rotax 912ULS four-stroke powerplant.

Originally a production line was set up in the United States, in Sebring, Florida, but this was later closed and in 2015 the company was noted as having no US presence or representation, although production continued in Brazil.

In 2008 the design was accepted as a Federal Aviation Administration approved special light-sport aircraft.

Operational history
In April 2016, there were twelve P-1s registered in the United States with the US Federal Aviation Administration.

Specifications (P1)

References

External links

2000s Brazilian ultralight aircraft
Light-sport aircraft
Single-engined tractor aircraft